The Bundesverband Musikindustrie (English: Federal Music Industry Association), or simply BVMI, represents the music industry in Germany. The association represents the interests of nearly 280 labels and music industry related enterprises, which comprise 90% of the music industry.

Bundesverband Musikindustrie is a member of International Federation of the Phonographic Industry (IFPI), which is based in London, England. IFPI consists of music associations of 70 countries.

BVMI works closely with GfK Entertainment (formerly "Media Control GfK International") (founded in 1976) which is in charge of publishing the music charts in Germany on weekly bases.

Bundesverband Musikindustrie, which is responsible for certifying Gold and Platinum certification awards, is led by Dieter Gorny, who has been the chairman since 2009.

Certification-awards 

Germany launched its Gold and Platinum award program in 1975, and relies on an independent auditor for the accuracy of the sales required for the awards.

While the BVMI has been the certifying body in Germany for the past few decades, BVMI wasn't always in charge of certifying the records there. Phono Press also known as ZVEI (Zentralverband Elektrotechnik- und Elektronikindustrie) was the body in charge of tracking records sales and the certifications. During the 1970s and 1980s, the certification levels for singles in Germany were 500,000 units for Gold and 1,000,000 units for Platinum, while the certification levels for albums were 250,000 and 500,000, respectively.  

BVMI instituted Diamond award on 1 June 2014 and applied the award to titles released starting from 1 January 2013.

Starting also from 1 June 2014, BVMI raised its certification-award-levels for the Singles, from the previous 150,000 units for Gold and 300,000 units for Platinum to 200,000 units for Gold and 400,000 units for Platinum. The change in the certification-levels of the Singles was affected by both inclusion of Streaming as well as an increase in sales of downloads that has been seen in recent years. 100 streams with the running time of at least 30 seconds or more, are considered as one single download.

BVMI follows the following pattern to certify records:

 1 x Gold
 1 x Platinum
 3 x Gold
 2 x Platinum
 5 x Gold
 3 x Platinum etc.

The association does not issue awards for 2 x Gold or 4 x Gold which overlie the requirements of platinum certification awards. Sales of both physical and digital, whether it is an album or a single, can be included for certification.

Certifications timeline 
Certifications levels are based on the recording release date, using the following thresholds:

See also
 List of best-selling albums in Germany
 List of best-selling singles in Germany
 Global music industry market share data

Notes
Notes

Note that Diamond-award both for the Singles and Albums will be applied to those titles released on/after 1 January 2013.

References 

Music industry associations
Organisations based in Berlin
Music organisations based in Germany